Cheon Sang-byeong (천상병) (January 29, 1930 – April 28, 1993) was a South Korean writer who overcame torture, impotence and alcoholism.

Life
Cheon Sang-byeong was born in Japan on January 29, 1930. He immigrated to Masan, Korea in 1945, after Korea was liberated from Japan. It was then that the 15-year-old Cheon began writing poems in the language of his ancestry. He published his first poem "River Water" while still in school.  Cheon went to Seoul National University for a short period. In 1967 he was implicated in the East Berlin Spy Incident and jailed for six months during which he was brutally tortured. This experience scarred Cheon who became impotent and alcoholic. Found unconscious on the street Cheon was institutionalized and his friends, believing him to be dead, published a posthumous book of his poetry.

Cheon, however recovered and began a prolific career.

Work

Cheon Sang-byeong wrote his poetry with the intention of transcending the immediate world. He avoided artificial technique and excessive and decorative language and instead embraced raw emotion and unforced simplicity, and candidly explored weighty existential problems. His poetry was written in substantial and condensed language with scarcely an unnecessary or frivolous expression to detract the reader's attention from his objective as the writer: to scrutinize and divine the origin of the universe, the existence of life after death, and the reason for human suffering. His most famous poem “Return to Heaven” (Gwicheon), speaks of a man's encounter with the afterlife and his journey from life to death, as a passing from one world to another: “I am returning to heaven, the day on which my sojourn to this beautiful world ends. Go and say it was beautiful.” Chun Sangbyeong remained consistent and faithful to his ideal of writing poetry that aspires to surmount the vortex of this superficial and empirical reality to reach a higher plane of thought and feeling, without the assistance of sentimental frippery or romantic trappings to embellish his work.

Works in Translation
 Rumanian: L ÎNTOARCEREA ÎN CER detail (천상병 시선집)
 Serbian: ПОВРАТАК НА НЕЪО detail (천상병 시선집 <귀천>) 
 Spanish: Regreso al cielo detail (귀천)
 Turkish: Gőğe dőnüş detail (귀천)
 French: Retour au ciel detail (천상병시선-귀천)

Works in Korean (Partial)
 Bird (1971)
 At the Roadside Inn (1979)
 If Even the Journey to Afterlife Costs Money (1987)
 I'm Going Back to Heaven (1993)
 Collected Works of Cheon Sang-byeong (1996)

References

External links
  "Cheon Sang-byeong" - at Naver
  Cheon Sang-byeong Art Festivalofficial

Korean male poets
1930 births
1993 deaths
20th-century Korean poets
Yeongyang Cheon clan
20th-century male writers